The canton of Cœur de Puisaye is an administrative division of the Yonne department, central France. It was created at the French canton reorganisation which came into effect in March 2015. Its seat is in Toucy. It includes part of the historical region of Puisaye. 

It consists of the following communes:
 
Beauvoir
Bléneau
Champcevrais
Champignelles
Diges
Dracy
Égleny
Fontaines
Lalande
Lavau
Leugny
Mézilles
Moulins-sur-Ouanne
Parly
Pourrain
Rogny-les-Sept-Écluses
Ronchères
Saint-Fargeau
Saint-Martin-des-Champs
Saint-Privé
Tannerre-en-Puisaye
Toucy
Villeneuve-les-Genêts
Villiers-Saint-Benoît

References

Cantons of Yonne